Policarpo Toro Hurtado (born in Melipilla, Chile on February 6, 1851 – died 1921 in Santiago, Chile) was a Chilean naval officer.

He enlisted in the Chilean Navy in 1871 and visited Easter Island in 1875. From 1877 to 1879, he joined the English Navy as a second lieutenant. In 1879, as the War of the Pacific started, he asked to return to Chile and participated in several actions. In 1883, he visited Easter Island a second time and elaborated in a document the economic advantages to Chile in acquiring the island.

With government approval, he visited the island in 1887. After a year of negotiations with the islanders under Atamu Tekena, on September 9, 1888, he took possession of the island on behalf of Chile. In 1891, he refused to participate in naval actions against José Manuel Balmaceda's government in the 1891 Chilean Civil War and was separated from the navy. In 1893, in the general amnesty enacted by the new government, he was pensioned. He died in Santiago in 1921.

Sources 

https://web.archive.org/web/20080211103355/http://www.armada.cl/site/tradicion_historia/historia/biografias/235ptoro.htm 
http://www.icarito.cl//medio/articulo/0,0,38035857_172985981_182488343_1,00.html 
https://web.archive.org/web/20080228212905/http://www.ligamar.cl/revis5/69.htm

1851 births
1921 deaths
Chilean Navy officers
Chilean Navy personnel of the War of the Pacific
19th-century Chilean Navy personnel